Jean-Paul Bruneteau is a French-Australian chef and author who is credited with playing a pioneering role in the development of an authentic Australian cuisine based on indigenous ingredients.

Born in 1956 in Vendee, France, Bruneteau migrated to Australia with his parents in 1967. Bruneteau became Chief Cook on the MV Australian Venture. He then worked in the kitchens of the Sydney Opera House.

In 1984 he opened Rowntrees, The Australian Restaurant, in Hornsby, Sydney, with business partner Jennifer Dowling. It was the first 'Australian' restaurant listed in the Yellow Pages.

Bruneteau experimented with various native ingredients supplied by small-scale regional suppliers and wholesalers of bushfoods. This included products like riberry, Dorrigo Pepper, tetragon (warrigal greens), lemon myrtle, Wattleseed and Illawarra plum.

In 1988, Bruneteau won a gold medal for 'The Most Original Cuisine' at the Second International Cooking Festival held in Tokyo, Japan where he created his signature dish, now world-famous 'The Rolled Wattleseed Pavlova', developed with the assistance of the Australian  Egg Corporation (now defunct).

In 1989, when visiting Australia, French Master Chef, Paul Bocuse paid tribute to Bruneteau's role in developing an Australian cuisine.

In 1991, Bruneteau and Dowling opened Riberries - Taste Australia restaurant, in Darlinghurst, Sydney. In 1996, Bruneteau published many of his ideas and culinary experiences with bushfood in a popular and award-winning book titled, Tukka, Real Australian Food.

Bruneteau then moved to Paris, France where he became the chef in two Australian themed restaurants, the Bennelong and Woolloomooloo.

He has recently returned to Australia and again is playing a leading role in Sydney's culinary forefront.

See also
 Bushfood
 Wattleseed
 Riberry
 Illawarra plum
 Dorrigo Pepper
 French Australian

References
 Bruneteau, Jean-Paul, Tukka, Real Australian Food, .

Australian chefs
Australian food writers
1956 births
Living people